The Xiafangshen Magnesium Mine
is one of the largest magnesium mines in China and in the world. The mine is located in the central part of Liaoning Province, at the Xiafangshen Sedimentary Metamorphic Magnesite Deposit. The mine has estimated reserves of 258 million tonnes of ore 47.3% magnesium.

References 

Magnesium mines in China
Anshan